Xylonite is one of seven Thames barges built between 1925 and 1930 for F W Horlock, Mistley. She was sold by the Horlocks in 1958 and cut down to a motor barge in 1958. Xylonite was re-rigged in the 1970s by Tim Eliff and replated on the 1980s. She has been used for sail training since 1983.

Description

She is built of steel, and while lacking the romance of a wooden ship, she has a greater cargo carrying capacity, and is lighter and cheaper to operate.
The name Xylonite derives from the original 1869 name for celluloid.

History
In 1924 the Horlocks commissioned seven new steel Thames barges, of which Xylonite was the third. Six of these ‘seven sisters’ are still afloat: Blue Mermaid was lost to a mine in World War 2.  They were built at Mistley. 

Xylonite was built in 1926 and delivered to Frederick William Horlock,(F.W. Horlock) who owned her for the first ten years. On 30 October 1936 Xylonite was sold to Marcus Frederick Horlock and Walter Richard Horlock. And on 31 October 1938 she was registered to M.F. Horlock and Company Ltd. Horlocks barges sailed under a blue burgee blazoned with a white maltese cross.

She was sold in August 1958 to The Greenhithe Lighterage Company Ltd and the Tester family. She was cut down to a motor barge, with all rigging removed and a new wheelhouse. The rear hold was modified to take a diesel engine. She carried cargo until June 1977.

From 1977 to 1984 she was owned by Tim and Brigid Eliff. They restored her to sail and rerigged her and she was run as a charter barge from the alongside the Prospect of Whitby pub in Wapping. She was chartered to Hoseasons, and carried purple coloured Duradon sails. The topmast was made from steel and would often buckle.

For the next twenty-two years, from 1984 to 2007 she was run by the Cirdan Trust, who used her to give sailing experiences to underprivileged children. This trust was run by Bill Broad, an Anglican churchman, his wife Daphne and John Corder Belfrage. The barge skipper Rebecca Polden and her partner bought her next, and did some serious restoration work and sold her on in summer 2011. They used her as a houseboat at Maylandsea.

Tim Kent, a London-based photographer operated her between 2011 and 2016 on the Medway and the London River. 

She is currently owned by Chris Palmer and based in Limehouse 

The United Kingdom Official Number was 145408

A replica of the Blue Mermaid is being constructed, and she was launched 28 May 2016 for the Sea-Change Sailing Trust. She will operate out of the Heybridge Basin.

Media
Dunkirk (2017 film) had a role.

References

Citations

Bibliography

External links
Cirdan Trust
2013 Medway Match

XXXXX
1926 ships
Individual sailing vessels
Ships built in Mistley
Transport on the River Thames
Sailing ships of the United Kingdom
Ships and vessels of the National Historic Fleet